Pacific Grove High School (PGHS) is a public high school located in Pacific Grove, California, between Carmel and Monterey.

History
Pacific Grove formed the Pacific Grove Unified School District in 1895. In June, 1896 the City passed a bond issue to build the town's first structure, a morgue, which was then turned into a high school. Pacific Grove High School was Monterey County's first public high school, but today it is its smallest. The first class graduated in June, 1898. The school has changed locations twice since then, first to what is now the Pacific Grove Middle School (PGMS), then to its current location on Sunset.

Pacific Grove shares a long-standing rivalry with Carmel High School, where every year the two football teams compete for a bronze shoe statue in the Shoe Game.

The picturesque baseball stadium was named "Don Curley Field" in 2003. A new artificial turf football stadium with an all-weather track was opened in 2009. The stadium project also yielded improvements to the multi-purpose room. An addition to the gym that was finished in 2012 yielded much improved locker room areas in addition to a new dance room. The newly renovated swimming pool opened in January 2014.

References

External links
 
 PGHS Alumni Website

High schools in Monterey County, California
Public high schools in California
Pacific Grove, California
1895 establishments in California